The Earth Science Education Unit (ESEU) develops and provides continuous professional development (CPD) workshops and resources for teachers and trainee teachers in Earth science Education across the UK.

History
ESEU was first set up in 2002 with funding from the UK Offshore Operators Association (UKOOA), initially providing workshops in England and Scotland for secondary teachers. In January 2003, ESEU launched workshops in Wales.  A second lot of funding from Oil and Gas UK, the umbrella organisation for the Oil and Gas industry in the UK, through OPITO, the Oil and Gas Academy, was secured in 2007 enabling ESEU to develop primary workshops in England and Wales at Key Stage 2 in 2009 and to launch new workshops in Scotland, written specially for the Curriculum for Excellence in 2010.

Workshops
ESEU provides workshops at Key Stages 2, 3 and 4, and for the Scottish Curriculum for Excellence, to teachers and to trainee teachers. Workshop fees are not paid for by the school or university but by ESEU. A team of 46 facilitators are spread across the UK and travel to schools to give workshops, taking rock samples and other equipment with them.

Practical, hands on activities are used in the workshops, which use simple, easily available and cheap materials, such as party poppers, Potty Putty and Slinky springs.

As well as activities for use in the classroom, ESEU also encourages teachers to make the most of the outdoor environment as a teaching resource, using a gradual approach, starting by using the view from a classroom window, then the school grounds, a local graveyard or building stones in the local town and finally any local quarry or outcrop.

ESEU workshops were found to have a long-term impact on those involved, even though the workshops only last for 90 minutes. This may be due to the practical and interactive activities which are used as the main part of the workshops.

Resources
ESEU also provides online resources, including a virtual rock kit, Scottish virtual activities and a rock reference sheet as well as videos of salol crystallising at different rates.

References

External links
The Earth Science Education Unit (ESEU)
ESEU Resources
Joint Earth Science Education Initiative (JESEI)
Earth Science Teachers' Association (ESTA)

Earth science research institutes